Robert Joseph Burns (born 7 October 1999) is a Northern Irish professional footballer who plays for Glentoran as a left back or midfielder.

Early and personal life
Burns was born in Antrim. He was the Head Boy at St. Malachy's College, and had intended to study mathematics at University College Dublin or Queen's University Belfast before becoming a professional footballer.

Club career

Glenavon
Burns played youth football for Lisburn Distillery and Cliftonville before joining Glenavon in June 2015.

Burns made his senior debut for Glenavon in the 2015–16 season final game against Linfield at 16 years old. The following season he went on loan with Knockbreda in January 2016. The club were battling relegation but Burns played attacking midfield and scored 8 goals in the final 8 league games to steer the club away from relegation on the final day of the season.

Burns then returned to Glenavon for the 2017–18 season. At Glenavon he scored 8 goals in 41 appearances, was nominated for the NI Football Writers' Association Young Player of the Year Award, and won Glenavon's Young Player of the Year and Fans' Player of the Year awards. Whilst at Glenavon he received offers from English clubs Rochdale and Bristol City but decided to stay at home and complete his A Level qualifications in school first.

Heart of Midlothian
Burns signed a three-year contract with Scottish club Heart of Midlothian in May 2018, for an undisclosed fee, with effect from June 2018. He described his professional football career as a 'dream come true', and stated he wanted to break into the Northern Ireland senior squad.

After being involved in pre-season fixtures, he made his competitive debut for the club on 18 July 2018, in a Scottish League Cup game against Cove Rangers, where he played the full 90 minutes in a 2–1 victory. In August 2018, Hearts loaned Burns to Livingston. His loan ended in January 2019.

Burns then returned to Hearts in January 2019. He played a number of games before the end of the season, including an Edinburgh derby and a Scottish Cup semi-final. Burns scored his first goal for Hearts in a 2–1 defeat against Aberdeen. He was then listed as an unused substitute for the 2019 Scottish Cup Final, which Hearts lost 2–1 to Celtic.

Loan to Newcastle Jets
In September 2019 he moved on loan to Australian side Newcastle Jets. He said he hoped the move would earn him his first senior international cap. Due to the shutdown of the league due to the COVID-19 pandemic, Burns left Australia in April 2020.

Barrow
On 4 August 2020, Burns joined League Two side Barrow.

On 3 October 2020 he moved on loan to Glentoran. On 2 November he suffered a double leg break during a match.

On 28 July 2021, Burns had his contract terminated by mutual consent.

Glentoran
On 31 July 2021, three days after his departure from Barrow, Burns returned to Glentoran on a permanent contract.

International career
He has been capped by Northern Ireland at under-19 and under-21 levels, and trained with the senior team.

Playing style
Burns was primarily a central midfielder, but also played as a left defender and as an attacker.

References

1999 births
Living people
Association footballers from Northern Ireland
Lisburn Distillery F.C. players
Cliftonville F.C. players
Glenavon F.C. players
Knockbreda F.C. players
Heart of Midlothian F.C. players
Livingston F.C. players
Newcastle Jets FC players
Barrow A.F.C. players
Glentoran F.C. players
NIFL Premiership players
Scottish Professional Football League players
Association football fullbacks
Association football midfielders
Northern Ireland under-21 international footballers
Northern Ireland youth international footballers
Expatriate soccer players in Australia
Expatriate association footballers from Northern Ireland
British expatriates in Australia
A-League Men players